An inlet is an indentation of a shoreline, usually long and narrow.

Inlet may also refer to:
 Inlet (album), a 2020 album by Hum
 Inlet, New York
 Inlet, Ohio
 Inlet, Wisconsin
 Engine inlet or intake, a component for admitting fluid into a system
 Inlet cone
 Inlet valve, a pipe connection that points toward a service provider or holding tank
 Appliance inlet, a power connector that receives electrical power

See also
Bay
Cove
Estuary
Firth
Fjord
Geo (landscape)
Sea loch
Sea lough
Sound (geography)